Angelo F. Greco (March 19, 1925 – April 29, 2004) was an American lawyer and politician.

Born in Milwaukee, Wisconsin, he served in the United States Army during World War II. He graduated from Lawrence University and received his law degree from University of Wisconsin Law School. He practiced law in Milwaukee. He served in the Wisconsin State Assembly 1961-1967 as a Democrat. He died in Milwaukee, Wisconsin.

Notes

1925 births
2004 deaths
Politicians from Milwaukee
Military personnel from Wisconsin
Lawrence University alumni
University of Wisconsin Law School alumni
Wisconsin lawyers
Democratic Party members of the Wisconsin State Assembly
20th-century American politicians
20th-century American lawyers